The 2015 China Masters Grand Prix Gold was the fifth grand prix and grand prix gold tournament of the 2015 BWF Grand Prix and Grand Prix Gold. The tournament was held at the Olympic Sports Center Xincheng Gymnasium in Changzhou, Jiangsu, China on April 14–19, 2015 and had a total purse of $250,000.

Men's singles

Seeds

  Wang Zhengming (champion)
  Tian Houwei (semi-final)
  Wei Nan (semi-final)
  Derek Wong Zi Liang (quarter-final)
  Xue Song (third round)
  Suppanyu Avihingsanon (second round)
  Vladimir Malkov (second round)
  Howard Shu (second round)

Finals

Top half

Section 1

Section 2

Section 3

Section 4

Bottom half

Section 5

Section 6

Section 7

Section 8

Women's singles

Seeds

  Michelle Li (withdrew)
  Iris Wang (second round)
  Yao Xue (second round)
  Hung Shih-han (second round)

Finals

Top half

Section 1

Section 2

Bottom half

Section 3

Section 4

Men's doubles

Seeds

  Liu Xiaolong / Qiu Zihan (second round)
  Danny Bawa Chrisnanta / Chayut Triyachart (second round)
  Li Junhui / Liu Yuchen (champion)
  Wang Yilu / Zhang Wen (final)

Finals

Top half

Section 1

Section 2

Bottom half

Section 3

Section 4

Women's doubles

Seeds

  Vivian Hoo Kah Mun / Woon Khe Wei (semi-final)
  Lim Yin Loo / Lee Meng Yean (second round)
  Bao Yixin / Tang Yuanting (final)
  Chen Hsiao-huan / Lai Chia-wen (quarter-final)

Finals

Top half

Section 1

Section 2

Bottom half

Section 3

Section 4

Mixed doubles

Seeds

  Liu Cheng / Bao Yixin (champion)
  Danny Bawa Chrisnanta / Vanessa Neo Yu Yan (second round)
  Edi Subaktiar / Gloria Emanuelle Widjaja (final)
  Ronald Alexander / Melati Daeva Oktaviani (second round)

Finals

Top half

Section 1

Section 2

Bottom half

Section 3

Section 4

References

China Masters
BWF Grand Prix Gold and Grand Prix
China Masters Grand Prix Gold
China Masters Grand Prix Gold
Changzhou
Sport in Jiangsu